Extraordinary Attorney Woo is a 2022 South Korean television series starring Park Eun-bin in the title role, along with Kang Tae-oh and Kang Ki-young. It follows Woo Young-woo, a female rookie attorney with autism, who is hired by a major law firm in Seoul. Being different from her neurotypical peers, her manner of communication is seen by them as odd, awkward, and blunt. With each legal case and through her intelligence and photographic memory, she becomes an increasingly competent attorney.

The show aired on ENA from June 29 to August 18, 2022, every Wednesday and Thursday at 21:00 (KST), for sixteen episodes. It is also available for streaming on Netflix in selected regions.

Extraordinary Attorney Woo set the record for the highest ratings in ENA history. It received audience acclaim, with its final episode recording 17.5% nationwide ratings, making it the eighth highest-rated drama in Korean cable television history and seventh highest-rated television drama by number of viewers.

Synopsis
Extraordinary Attorney Woo tells the story of Woo Young-woo, an autistic lawyer who is raised by her single father. She grows up with one friend at school, Dong Geu-ra-mi, an oddball girl who protects her from school bullies. She graduates at the top of her law school class at Seoul National University. Because she's autistic, no one will hire her. However, through a connection of her father's, she obtains her first job at Hanbada, a large Seoul law firm. Attorney Woo's intelligence and photographic memory help her to become an excellent lawyer, as she is able to recall laws and everything she reads, sees, or hears perfectly.

Being different from neurotypical peers, her manner of communication is initially seen as odd and awkward, and her strong emotional intelligence remains unrecognized. But as the series progresses, many of the people she meets, such as her supervising lawyer, Jung Myung-seok, her law school classmate and peer, Choi Su-yeon, and legal support staffer Lee Jun-ho adjust to her as she learns her craft as a rookie attorney. But she also encounters people who are prejudiced against her and others with disabilities, including her fellow colleague Kwon Min-woo, who often tries to sabotage her.

Many of the legal cases in the series involve finely balanced legal issues and sometimes difficult ethical questions. Attorney Woo's approach is often unique and helps resolve cases in unexpected ways. One storyline about Young-woo's parents runs through the series and involves the rivalry between two major law firms, both chaired by female attorneys, Han Seon-young, CEO of Hanbada, and Tae Soo-mi, CEO of Taesan.

Another theme that runs through the series is Young-woo's strong interest in whales and other marine mammals. Her tendency to analogize situations she faces in her professional and private life with the lives and characteristics of whales and dolphins often surprises and confounds the people who surround her. Her eureka moments often coincide with fantasizing about marine animals.

Cast and characters

Main
 Park Eun-bin as Woo Young-woo
 Oh Ji-yul as young Woo Young-woo
 A rookie lawyer at the Hanbada law firm. She is the first attorney with ASD in Korea.
 Kang Tae-oh as Lee Jun-ho
 An employee in the litigation team at Hanbada
 Kang Ki-young as Jung Myung-seok
 A senior attorney at Hanbada and Woo Young-woo's mentor

Supporting
 Jeon Bae-soo as Woo Gwang-ho
 Jang Seong-beom as young Woo Gwang-ho
 Woo Young-woo's single father
 Baek Ji-won as Han Seon-young
 CEO of Hanbada
 Jin Kyung as Tae Soo-mi
 Jung Han-bit as young Tae Soo-mi
 CEO of the Taesan law firm and biological mother of Woo Young-woo
 Ha Yoon-kyung as Choi Su-yeon
 Woo Young-woo's law school classmate and colleague at Hanbada
 Joo Jong-hyuk as Kwon Min-woo
 Woo Young-woo's colleague and rival at Hanbada
 Joo Hyun-young as Dong Geu-ra-mi
 Woo Young-woo's close friend
 Im Sung-jae as Kim Min-shik
 The owner of the pub where Dong Geu-ra-mi works

Special appearances

 Kang Ae-sim as Choi Yeong-ran (ep. 1)
 A client of Hanbada who is accused of attempting to murder her husband.
 Lee Do-kyung as Park Gyu-sik (ep. 1)
 Choi Yeong-ran's husband, who has dementia.
 Ha Dong-joon as psychiatrist (ep.1) 
 Shin Ha-young as Kim Hwa-young (ep. 2)
 A client of Hanbada who has a wardrobe malfunction with her wedding dress.
 Yoon Joo-sang as Kim Gong-gu (ep. 2)
 Kim Hwa-young's father
 Moon Sang-hoon as Kim Jeong-hoon (ep. 3)
 An autistic client who is accused of the murder of his brother.
 Yoon Yoo-sun as Jeon Gyeong-hee (ep. 3)
 Kim Jeong-hoon's mother
 Sung Ki-yun as Kim Jin-pyeong (ep. 3)
 Kim Jeong-hoon's father
 Lee Bong-jun as Kim Sang-hoon (ep. 3)
 Kim Jeong-hoon's brother, who attempts to commit suicide.
 Choi Dae-hoon as Jang Seung-jun (eps. 3, 15)
 An attorney at Hanbada, and Jung Myung-seok's rival
 Jung Seok-yong as Dong Dong-sam (ep. 4)
 Dong Geu-ra-mi's father
 Ko In-beom as Dong Dong-il (ep. 4)
 Dong Dong-sam's eldest brother
 Lee Sang-hee as Dong Dong-i (ep. 4)
 Dong Dong-sam's second brother
 Lee Seo-hwan as Jin-hyeok (ep. 4)
 Dong Dong-sam's neighbour and head of village
 Kim Kyung-min as Byeong-joo (ep. 4)
 Dong Dong-il's lawyer
 Yoon Byung-hee as Bae Seong-cheol (ep. 5)
 Leader of the research and development team at Ihwa ATM company
 Lee Sung-wook as Hwang Doo-yong (ep. 5)
 Sales manager at Ihwa ATM
 Shin Hyun-jong as Oh Jin-jong (ep. 5)
 President of Geumgang ATM
 Kim Do-hyun as Kim Woo-seong (ep. 5)
 The lawyer who represents Oh Jin-jong.
 Kim Hi-eo-ra as Gye Hyang-shim (ep. 6)
 A client of Hanbada who is a North Korean defector.
 Lee Ki-young as Ryu Myung-ha (eps. 6, 12)
 The judge sitting on Gye Hyang-shim's and Kim Hyun-jeong's cases
 Lim Seong-mi as Lee Soon-yeong (ep. 6)
 The victim of Gye Hyang-shim's case
 Seo Young-sam as Kwon Byung-gil (ep. 6)
 A doctor related to Gye Hyang-shim's case
 Nam Jin-bok as Kim Jeong-bong (ep. 6)
 The prosecutor in charge of Gye Hyang-shim's case
 Jung Gyu-soo as Choi Han-soo (eps. 7–8)
 Head of Sodeokdong village
 Kim Sung-bum as Jo Hyeon-woo (eps. 7–8)
 A resident of Sodeokdong village
 Park Kang-seop as Park Yoo-jin (eps. 7–8)
 A civil servant at Gyeonghae provincial office
 Koo Kyo-hwan as Bang Gu-ppong (ep. 9)
Commander of the Children's Liberation Army
 Lee Won-jung as Yang Jeong-il (ep. 10)
 Suspect of quasi-rape against an intellectually disabled woman
 Oh Hye-soo as Shin Hye-yeong (ep. 10)
 A woman with intellectual disabilities
 Lee Jung-eun as Shin Hye-yeong's mother (ep. 10)
 Jung Ji-ho as Yoon Jae-won (ep. 11)
 A man who won a large lottery prize while gambling at a casino
 Heo Dong-won as Shin Il-soo (ep. 11)
 Yoon Jae-won's acquaintance, who files a lawsuit against him.
 Jung Kang-hee as Park Seong-nam (ep. 11)
 Shin Il-su's acquaintance, who files the lawsuit with him.
 Park Ji-yeon as Sung Soo-ji (ep. 11)
 Shin Il-su's wife
 Seo Hye-won as Choi Da-hae (ep. 11)
 A coffee salesperson at the casino
 Jang Won-hyuk as Han Byung-gil (ep. 11)
 The errand boy at the casino, an illegal Korean-Chinese immigrant
 Lee Bong-ryun as Ryu Jae-sook (ep. 12)
 An attorney specializing in gender discrimination cases
 Kim Hee-chang as Moon Jong-chul (ep. 12)
 Human resources manager at Mir Life Insurance
 Lee Ji-hyun as Kim Hyun-jeong (ep. 12)
 Former deputy manager at Mir Life Insurance
 Lee Moon-jung as Lee Ji-young (ep. 12)
 Former assistant manager Mir Life Insurance
 Lee Ji-min as Choi Yeon-hee  (ep. 12)
 An employee at Mir Life Insurance
 Lee Yoon-ji as Choi Ji-soo (eps. 13–14, 16)
Jung Myung-seok's ex-wife
 Yoon Na-moo as Jung-nam (ep. 13)
 Lee Jun-ho's brother-in-law
 Song Yong-tae as Kim Yun-bok (ep. 13)
 A client of Hanbada
 Hur Hyun-ho as Hwangjisa Temple governor (ep. 13)
 Kim Gun-ho as collector of admission fees at Hwangjisa (ep. 13)
 Lee Ki-seop as Lee Seok-jun (ep. 14)
 Hwangjisa's legal representative
 Kim Joo-hun as Bae In-cheol (eps. 15–16)
 CEO and founder of Raon
 Ryu Kyung-hwan as Kim Chan-hong (eps. 15–16)
 Co-CEO and co-founder of Raon
 Han Sa-myeong as Choi Jin-pyo (ep. 15)
 A team leader at Raon
 Park Jin-young as the judge sitting on Raon's case (ep. 15)
 Ham Tae-in as an employee at Taesan law firm (ep. 16)
 Choi Hyun-jin as Choi Sang-hyeon (eps. 15–16)
 Son of Tae Soo-mi

Episodes

Production
Filming of the series wrapped up on July 14, 2022.

On August 17, 2022, president Lee Sang-baek of AStory, the production company for Extraordinary Attorney Woo, confirmed that the drama would be renewed for a second season. Season 2 is expected to premiere in 2024.

Original soundtrack

The show's soundtrack album peaked at number twelve on the weekly Circle Album Chart, and as of September 2022, 12,198 copies had been sold.

Viewership
The first episode of Extraordinary Attorney Woo recorded a nationwide viewership rating of 0.9%. By the third episode, which reached 4.0%, it set the record for the highest rating in ENA's history.

The series was the most viewed non-English show globally on Netflix for the weeks of July 4–10 and July 11–17, logging 23.9 million and 45.5 million hours viewed and ranking in the top ten in 12 and 22 countries, respectively. For the week of July 18—24, it was the second most-watched non-English show, gathering 55 million of viewing hours. It was also the most-watched series in eight countries and appeared in the top ten in 27 others. The series returned to the top of the chart for the week of July 25–31, with 65.5 million viewing hours, and was the most-watched show in nineteen countries, while ranking among the top ten in 25 more. Extraordinary Attorney Woo continued to top the charts for another six consecutive weeks after its finale, garnering 348.15 million viewing hours.

The series became the "sixth most popular non-English show of all time" on Netflix, spent "20 weeks on the Global Non-English Top 10 list", and marked 21 weeks in the list for November 28 – December 4, 2022.

Accolades

Adaptation
On July 6, 2022, AStory announced that the series would be adapted into a webtoon of the same name. Serialized into sixty episodes, drawn by illustrator HwaUmJo, and written by Yuil, it will be available in Korean, English, Japanese, and Chinese.

On July 14, it was reported that a US remake is currently in discussion.

On August 17, it was confirmed that a musical remake will be coming in 2024.

On September 6, it was confirmed that the remake was offered in approximately ten countries and is currently in discussion.

Notes

References

External links
  
 
 
 
 
 

ENA television dramas
Television series by AStory
South Korean legal television series
2022 South Korean television series debuts
2022 South Korean television series endings
Korean-language Netflix exclusive international distribution programming
Autism in television